Malakhovka, a Moscow suburb renowned for its historic dachas, is an urban locality (a work settlement) in Lyuberetsky District of Moscow Oblast, Russia. Population:

History
Under the name Malakhovskoye, Malakhovka was first mentioned in 1328 in Ivan Kalita's will as a place left to Ivan's older son Semyon.

With the completion of a railway station in 1884 Malakhovka was recognized as a dacha settlement. By the end of 19th century, the settlement was inhabited by such renowned representatives of Russian arts and literature as Anton Chekhov, Maxim Gorky, Ivan Bunin, and Feodor Chaliapin. Chaliapin performed in the Malakhovka's Summer Theater before 1914. The actress Faina Ranevskaya performed there from the following year, and also had a dacha there. At the time of the Revolution Malakhovka was a described as a "hamlet" of about three hundred dachas.

Urban-type settlement status was granted to Malakhovka in 1961.

Administrative and municipal status
Within the framework of administrative divisions, Malakhovka is incorporated within Lyuberetsky District of Moscow Oblast. Within the framework of municipal divisions, Malakhovka is a part of a larger Malakhovka Urban Settlement, which, in addition to Malakhovka proper, also includes the village of Pekhorka and adjacent territories.

Economy and infrastructure
The settlement has minor industry: an ore mining equipment factory and a food processing plant. There are also two sanatoriums, a history museum, an Orthodox church, and a synagogue.

Media
Malakhovka has a local newspaper, Malakhovsky Vestnik ("Malakhovka Herald").

Notable people
Marc Chagall taught at a Jewish boys shelter (mainly for refugees from Ukrainian pogroms) here in 1921, did the illustrations for David Hofstein's long poem "Troyer" (Grief) and worked on his mural "Introduction to the Jewish Theater".  The refuge was a center for many Yiddish writers including Der Nister, who lived with Chagall, David Hofstein, Moshe Lifshits and Itzik Feffer.

The Soviet writer and USSR State Prize Laureate Nikolay Dobronravov (husband of Aleksandra Pakhmutova) went to school in Malakhovka during the war. The Olympic and World champion runner Irina Privalova was born in Malakhovka.

An early (1959) poem by Andrey Voznesensky is "Last Train to Malakhovka", regarding his regular trips to the settlement.

References

Notes

Sources
Toda, Yasushi and Nozdrina, Nadezhda N. (2008) The Cottages in Suburban Moscow: A New Lifestyle for the Wealthy, Journal of Communist Studies and Transition Politics, 24: 3, 444—455
Timothy J. Colton (1998) Moscow: Governing the Socialist Metropolis, Harvard University Press, 1998, page 127.

Urban-type settlements in Moscow Oblast
Bronnitsky Uyezd